Kelvin Kiptum (born 2 December 1999) is a Kenyan long-distance runner. He ran the fastest ever marathon debut at the 2022 Valencia Marathon, becoming just the third man in history to break two hours and two minutes.

Career
Kiptum gained his first international experience in March 2019 when finishing fifth at the Lisbon Half Marathon (59:54). In December 2020, he set new personal best in the event of 58:42, placing sixth at the Valencia Half Marathon. In 2021, he ran 59:35 and 59:02 half marathons in Lens, France (first) and Valencia (eighth) respectively.

On 4 December 2022, the 23-year-old pulled off an upset when debuting in the marathon at the Valencia Marathon. With the quickest second half ever (60:15), he set the fourth-fastest time on the world all-time list of 2:01:53, becoming only the third man in history to break 2:02 after world record holder Eliud Kipchoge (2:01:09 and 2:01:39) and Kenenisa Bekele (2:01:41). Kiptum's winning time was by far the fastest marathon debut ever, smashing the course record by more than a minute. He beat 2022 world marathon champion Tamirat Tola, pre-race favourite, among others.

Personal bests
 10,000 metres – 28:27.87 (Stockholm 2021)
 10 kilometres – 28:17 (Utrecht 2019)
 Half marathon – 58:42 (Valencia 2020)
 Marathon – 2:01:53 (Valencia 2022) #3rd athlete all time

References

External links
 

1999 births
Living people
Kenyan male long-distance runners
Kenyan male marathon runners